Yuen Long is a town in the western New Territories, Hong Kong. To its west lie Hung Shui Kiu, Tin Shui Wai, Lau Fau Shan and Ha Tsuen, to the south Shap Pat Heung and Tai Tong, to the east Au Tau and Kam Tin, and to the north Nam Sang Wai.

Name
The Cantonese name Yuen Long may refer to the limits of the original market town, Yuen Long New Town, Yuen Long Plain or Yuen Long District.

Market town
The central part of Yuen Long was traditionally a market town, in the area now known as Yuen Long San Hui, in Yuen Long District, where people from the surrounding villages sold their crops and fish. The market is still a place where people from villages in the northwest New Territories shop and trade. Like many market towns in Hong Kong, the market operates only on certain days each week. Modern shopping malls and restaurants have also established.

New towns

Two new towns have been developed in Yuen Long since the 1970s:

Yuen Long New Town was developed in and around the market town in the late 1970s and early 1980s.

Tin Shui Wai New Town was established in the 1990s to the west of Yuen Long New Town, separate from Yuen Long New Town. It is mostly residential.

There are Light Rail Transit and several bus routes serving between the two towns.

Housing estate
The private residential estate Fairview Park is in the northeast part of Yuen Long.

History
The earliest market in Yuen Long was south of the main road, near Tai Kei Leng. In 1669, the market was moved north to the area near the present-day Yuen Long station. This area is now known as Yuen Long Kau Hui (元朗舊墟, lit. "old Yuen Long Town"). This market is sited south of a small hill. While it is far from the coast today, it was beside the seashore when the market was first built.

Cheung Shing Street, which separates Nam Pin Wai and Sai Pin Wai, divides the centre of the market. Temples were built for worship and to judge disputes. After the British leased the New Territories in 1898, they built Castle Peak Road to connect major areas of the New Territories and Kowloon. The villagers proposed and moved the market town to the main road. After the Second World War, Yuen Long Town dramatically increased in size, going from a small village into a large town known for its numerous cultural and sporting events.

2019 Yuen Long attack

The 2019 Yuen Long attack was a mob attack that occurred on 21 July 2019, in Yuen Long, Hong Kong. A mob of over 100 armed men dressed in white indiscriminately attacked civilians on the streets and passengers in the Yuen Long MTR station including the elderly, children, black-clad protesters, journalists and lawmakers. At least 45 people were injured in the incident, including a pregnant woman. The attack happened following an anti-extradition bill protest in Sheung Wan, Hong Kong and was an act perpetrated against the pro-democracy protesters.

Climate

Cross-border activities 
Due to their proximity to the Shenzhen border in China's Guangdong province, towns in the northern parts of Hong Kong, notably Sheung Shui and Yuen Long, have become hubs for parallel traders who have been buying up large quantities of goods, forcing up local prices and disrupting the daily lives of local citizens. Since 2012, there has been a vertiginous increase in Chinese parallel traders arriving in the North District of Hong Kong to re-export infant formula and household products – goods popular with the Chinese – across the border to Shenzhen. Trafficking caused chronic local shortages of milk powder in Hong Kong, which led the government to impose restrictions on the amount of milk powder exports from Hong Kong.

The first anti-parallel trading protest was started at Sheung Shui in September 2012. As government efforts to limit the adverse impact of Chinese trafficking were widely seen as inadequate, there have been further subsequent protests in towns in the North District including Sheung Shui. A campaign called Liberate Yuen Long was mounted on 1 March 2015 by localist groups to protest smuggling and parallel trading.

Public transport
The following information show transportation in Yuen Long.

Inside Yuen Long Town

Buses
 KMB routes 53, 54, 64K, 68A, 68E, 68F, 68M, 68R, 68X, 76K, 77K, 264R, 268A, 268B, 268C, 268P, 268X, 269D, 276, 276P, 869, 968, 968A, 968X, B1, N269, N368, R968
 Route B1 to Lok Ma Chau station Control Point, a customs checkpoint between Hong Kong and China
 MTR Bus routes K65, K66, K68, K73, K74
 Long Win Bus routes A36, E36, E36A, N30, NA36
 New Lantao Bus route B2
 Route B2 to Shenzhen Bay Port, a customs checkpoint between Hong Kong and China

Rail

 MTR Tuen Ma line
 Light Rail routes 610, 614, 615 and 761P

Outside Yuen Long Town (except via Yuen Long Town)

Buses
 KMB routes 51, 64S, 69C, 69M, 69P, 69X, 251A, 251B, 251M, 265B, 265M, 265S, 269A, 269B, 269C, 269M, 269P, 276A, 276B
 MTR Bus routes K75, K75A, K75P
 Long Win Bus routes A37, E36P, E37, NA37
 New Lantao Bus routes B2P, B2X
 Routes B2P and B2X to Shenzhen Bay Port, a customs checkpoint between Hong Kong and China
 Citybus routes 967, 967X, 969, 969A, 969B, 969C, 969P, 969X, N969

Rail
 MTR Tuen Ma line
 Light Rail routes 705, 706 and 751

Demographics

Yuen Long residents are mainly local ethnic Han with a sizable Hoa immigrants, Vietnamese Chinese from the 1970s to 1990s.

Education
The Yuen Long West area, meaning areas west of Tai Tong Road and the Yuen Long Nullah and south of Kau Yuk Road, is in Primary One Admission (POA) School Net 73. The other parts are in POA 74.

Within POA 73 are multiple aided schools (operated independently but funded with government money) and one government school: South Yuen Long Government Primary School (南元朗官立小學). POA 74 has multiple aided schools and one government school: Yuen Long Government Primary School (元朗官立小學).

Schools in Yuen Long include:
Yuen Long Public Secondary School
 N.T. Heung Yee Kuk Yuen Long District Secondary School
Yuen Long Catholic Secondary School
ELCHK Yuen Long Lutheran Secondary School
CCC Kei Yuen College

The Yuen Kong Kindergarten is in Yuen Kong Tsuen. It had five students in 2009 and 64 students in 2011; Elaine Yau of the South China Morning Post stated that the school had faced closure but has since improved. The film Little Big Master is about the kindergarten.

In popular culture
The 2003 Hong Kong drama Vigilante Force by TVB starring Bowie Lam is set in Yuen Long.
The school in 2020 Hong Kong drama We are the Littles by ViuTV starring Stephy Tang, Zeno Koo, Ian Chan and Anson Lo is in Yuen Long. The same school is also appeared in the 2022 Hong Kong drama Into the Wild by ViuTV starring Stanley Yau.

See also
2019 Yuen Long attack

References

 
Yuen Long District